Polygala sekhukhuniensis is a species of flowering plant in the milkwort family (Polygalaceae). It is endemic to South Africa.

References

sekhukhuniensis
Flora of Botswana